Govejek may refer to the following places in Slovenia:

Govejk, a settlement in the Municipality of Idrija (known as Govejek until 1980)
Osolnik, Medvode, a settlement in the Municipality of Medvode (known as Govejek until 1979)
Trnovec, Medvode, a settlement in the Municipality of Medvode (which annexed part of Govejek in 1979)